MAZ-5335 is a Soviet truck, manufactured at the Minsk Automobile Plant from 1977 to 1990.

Description 
In 1977, the production line began to go upgraded MAZ automobiles MAZ-5335 flatbed MAZ-5335 and MAZ-516B, dump trucks MAZ-5549, tractors MAZ-5429 and MAZ-5430. The MAZ-5335 series remained available until 1990.

Modifications 
 MAZ-5335 (1977-1990): Standard production model.
 MAZ-53352 (1977-1990): As MAZ-5335 but with a slightly longer wheelbase
Amongst other changes, it received double glazing and extra insulation on cables and hoses.
 MAZ-5334 (1977-1990): Cab-chassis version of the MAZ-5335, designed to be fitted with various special purpose bodies.
 MAZ-516B (1977-1990): 3-axle truck with a lifting third axle. Equipped with the 300 hp YaMZ-238N engine.
 MAZ-5549 (1977-1990): Dump truck, improved version of MAZ-503A.
 MAZ-5428: Prototype three-axle tractor-trailer, possibly meant to replace the MAZ-504V.
 MAZ-5429, MAZ-5430 (1977-1990): Two-axle tractor-trailer version, an improved version of MAZ-504A. The MAZ-5430 was equipped with hydraulics for towing tipping trailers.
 MAZ-504V2: Tractor-trailer based on MAZ-5429 for international routes with Sovtransavto. Equipped with the YaMZ-238 engine.
 MAZ-509A (1978-1990): Logging truck based on the MAZ-5335.
 MAZ-515B: Three-axle tractor-trailer, improved version of MAZ-515A. The cab was from the MAZ-5335 and had a new bumper with rectangular headlights, similar to the MAZ-5428.

External links

Trucks of the Soviet Union
5335
Vehicles introduced in 1977